EEOC v. Wyoming, 460 U.S. 226 (1983), is a United States Supreme Court case about forcible retirement of an employee of the Wyoming Game and Fish Department.

The EEOC was represented by Solicitor General Rex E. Lee.

References 

Ageism case law
United States Supreme Court cases
United States Supreme Court cases of the Burger Court
1983 in United States case law